South Korean football in 2021.

Leagues

K League 1

K League 2

K3 League

K4 League

WK-League

Cups

Korean FA Cup

South Korean clubs performance in Asia

Champions League

National teams

Men's

Results

Women's

Results

References

Seasons in South Korean football